Sililo Kivalu (born 8 July 1999) is a Wallisian athlete who has represented Wallis and Futuna at the Pacific Mini Games.

Kivalu participated in athletics at the 2017 Pacific Mini Games, where he won bronze in the decathlon.

He took part in the 2018 Melanesian Athletics Championships, where he won the pole vault, as the only participant, and was awarded bronze in the long jump.

At the 2019 Oceania Athletics Championships, he came seventh in the decathlon, and at the 2019 Pacific Games, he came fifth in the decathlon with 5,249 points.

References

Living people
1999 births
Wallis and Futuna athletes